For people named Michal or Michale, see Michal (disambiguation)

Michale  (German: Michelau) is a village in the administrative district of Gmina Dragacz, within Świecie County, Kuyavian-Pomeranian Voivodeship, in north-central Poland.

Notable residents
 Karl Wilhelm Krause (1911–2001), valet and bodyguard to Adolf Hitler

References

Michale